A squadron code is a marking used on a military aircraft to visually identify the squadron that it is assigned to.

Squadron codes of the World War II era, notably for Royal Air Force (RAF) and United States Army Air Forces (USAAF) aircraft operating in Europe, typically consisted of two characters (commonly two letters; sometimes a letter and a number) to denote the squadron, plus a third character to identify a specific aircraft and serve as its call sign. In general, when an aircraft was lost or withdrawn from use, its call sign was applied to its replacement or another aircraft.

Gallery

See also
 List of RAF squadron codes
 List of USAAF squadron codes
 South African Air Force squadron identification codes

References

Aircraft markings